DXKM may refer to:
 DXKM (General Santos), an FM radio station broadcasting in General Santos, branded as Magic
 DXKM (Kidapawan), an FM radio station broadcasting in Kidapawan, branded as One Radio